Way Back Home is a Decca Records compilation 78rpm album of phonograph records by Bing Crosby featuring sentimental and homely songs .

Background
Bing Crosby had enjoyed unprecedented success during the 1940s but his discography indicates that the hits were becoming less frequent. His record company - Decca - had enthusiastically embraced the relatively new vinyl long-playing discs by putting out many albums of his songs to counter the reduction in hit singles. This particular album was one of the last to be issued in all three formats of 78rpm and 45rpm albums as well as a  LP. Two of the songs had already been hits with "Just a Prayer Away" reaching the No. 4 spot and "'Way Back Home" charting also.

Reception
Billboard did not review the album but it had reviewed many of the separate single issues.

'Way Back Home If it hadn't been for "Mule Train," this one would have swept at once. As it is, its success has only been delayed a bit. Song, an oldie, is a natural, and the Bing-Waring team do it mightily.

The Iowa Indian Song Bing makes strong medicine, with the Waring council whooping and tom-toming.

My Own Bit of Land
Bing spreads warmth and a homey flavor in warbling this pleasing chunk of homespun philosophy. Fine for the family trade.

Just a Prayer Away — My Mother's Waltz There is plenty of vocal and instrumental embellishment to the spinning of these sides. But it's still to the credit of Bing Crosby that it is entirely his chanting that makes this couplet a desired one. For "Just a Prayer Away," singing the ballad at a moderately slow tempo, the Ken Darby Singers blend their voices with the organology of Ethel Smith and Victor Young's orchestra. Miss Smith's organ playing is pronounced throughout, and the entire company adds up to a simple setting that heightens Bing's simplicity in selling a song. Just as fitting and attractive is the setting created for Crosby's chanting of Dave Franklin's "My Mother's Waltz," rich in sentimental melodic and lyrical content, and sure to find immediate response among the three-quarter-time fans. For the phonos, "Just a Prayer Away" packs most of the nickel appeal where the fans are content to give a listen.

The Last Mile Home
Bing evokes plenty of nostalgia with this warm rendition of a sentimental tune. Fine production backing.

The Meadows of Heaven
Crosby and a chorus work over a pretty plug melody for attractive results.

Track listing
The songs were featured on a four-disc, 78 rpm album set, Decca Album No. A-826.

The songs were also featured on a four-disc, 45 rpm album set, catalog number 9-204.

LP release
The songs were also featured on a 10" LP album, Decca DL 5310 issued in 1951.
Side 1

Side 2

References 

Bing Crosby compilation albums
Decca Records compilation albums
1951 compilation albums